Norwegian Traveller can refer to:

Indigenous Norwegian Travellers, an ethnic minority
Norwegian and Swedish Travellers (or Tater), a group of Romani people
Traveller Norwegian language

Language and nationality disambiguation pages